Ruus is an Estonian surname. As of 1 January 2021, 212 men and 246 women have the surname Ruus in Estonia. In terms of the distribution of surnames, Ruus ranks  265th for men and 245th for women. The surname is most commonly found in Hiiu County, where 7.36 per 10,000 inhabitants of the county bear the name.

Notable people bearing the surname Ruus include:

Aarne Ruus (1909–1968), actor and theatre director
Ago Ruus (born 1949), film cinematographer and director
Erik Ruus (born 1962), actor
Jaan Ruus (1938–2017), journalist, film critic and editor 
Hando Ruus (1917–1945), soldier and artist
Karl Robert Ruus (1899–1946), politician
Neeme Ruus (1911–1942), politician, communist activist and Esperantist
Raissa Ruus (1942–1986), middle-distance runner
Tõnu Ruus (1940–2019), physicist

References

Estonian-language surnames